Service Industries Limited (SIL), doing business as Servis, is a Pakistani multinational shoes and tire manufacturer which is based in Lahore, Pakistan.

The company's factories are located in the Pakistani cities of Gujrat, Muridke, Nooriabad, Raiwind, Negombo, Sri Lanka. The company had humble beginnings in 1941. Servis Shoes is a shoe manufacturing company and Servis Tyres is a tire manufacturing company working under the Servis Industries Limited.

Products 
Servis Group is operating through a network of more than 450 retail company stores nationwide and also supplies its products to over 2500 independent retailers in Pakistan.

Servis Group has currently two main product lines or manufacturing companies.
 Servis Shoes (oldest and a leading manufacturer of shoes in Pakistan)
 Servis Tyres supplies its tires (tyres) for motorcycles, bicycles, motor rickshaws and trolleys in Pakistan.

Servis Industries exports its shoes, tyres (tires), rubber tubes to Europe, Middle East, South America, Africa and other Asian countries.

Footwear brands
 Servis brand shoes (company's oldest and largest brand)
 Cheetah brand sport shoes
 Don Carlos brand men's premium formal footwear
 Shoe Planet, high fashion brand shoes
 Liza, shoes brand for women
 Lark and Finch shoes
 Calza, shoes for men
 T.Z, shoes for kids
 Klara Shoes

Tyres and tubes
Less than half of its sales revenues come from tyres and tubes.

See also 
 Servis Industries cricket team

References

External links 
Servis Group official website

 
Conglomerate companies of Pakistan
Shoe companies of Pakistan
Multinational companies headquartered in Pakistan
Manufacturing companies based in Lahore
Manufacturing companies established in 1941
1941 establishments in British India
Companies listed on the Pakistan Stock Exchange